The Parish of Mulwaree is a parish of Argyle County. It is located on the western shore of Lake Bathurst, New South Wales.

History
The area was traditional lands of the Ngunnawal people, but was also traversed by other tribes going to the coast or the Monaro during the Bogong moth season. Stone artefacts dating back 20,000 years have been found at nearby Lake George.

The Lake Bathurst was discovered in April 1818 by an exploration commissioned by Governor Lachlan Macquarie to find a route from the inland to the settlement on the south coast at Jervis Bay that was headed by Surveyor General James Meehan. A village of Mulwaree was gazetted in the 19th century on the southern shore of Lake Bathurst, but failed to grow, moving 1½km to the west at the site of Tarago, on the main trainline.

Geography
Significant features in the parish include:
The Mulwaree River, a perennial river that is part of the Hawkesbury-Nepean catchment.
Lake Bathurst (New South Wales) on the northern boundary
 Townships of Tarago and Lake Bathurst

Ecology
The area has been identified by BirdLife International as an Important Bird Area (IBA) because it regularly supports significant numbers of
near threatened blue-billed ducks
Australasian shovellers.
freckled ducks,
black swans, chestnut teals and
sharp-tailed sandpipers.

See also
Lake Bathurst (New South Wales)

Economy
The Parish is predominantly Agricultureal in its economic base, however, the economic base has diversified in recent years with:
An Intermodal transfer station on the main Sydney to Canberra railwayline.
the former Woodlawn Mine now a major waste facility for Sydney.
Woodlawn Wind Farm.
Woodlawn Bioreactor.
The parish has begun to be used as commuter zone for the nearby city of Canberra.

References

Parishes of Argyle County
Southern Tablelands